The White River is a  river that flows through the U.S. states of Arkansas and Missouri. Originating in the Boston Mountains of northwest Arkansas, it arcs northwards through southern Missouri before turning back into Arkansas, flowing southeast to its mouth at the Mississippi River.

Hydrography

Course 
The source of the White River is in the Boston Mountains of northwest Arkansas, in the Ozark–St. Francis National Forest southeast of Fayetteville. The river flows northwards from its source to loop through southwest Missouri before heading southeast through Arkansas to its mouth on the Mississippi River.

On entering the Mississippi River Valley region near Batesville, Arkansas, the river becomes navigable to shallow-draft vessels, and its speed decreases considerably. The final  serves as the last segment of the McClellan-Kerr Arkansas River Navigation System; this part of the channel is deeper than the rest of the river.

Discharge 

Flood Management & Reservoir Creation
In the 20th century, large sections of the White River were modified via dam construction to form a series of artificial reservoirs for the purpose of flood control, as well as hydroelectric power generation, water distribution and management, and recreation. The first of these encountered from the headwaters is Beaver Lake in northwest Arkansas, followed by Table Rock Lake and Lake Taneycomo in southern Missouri, and finally Bull Shoals Lake as the river loops southward into northern Arkansas. Downstream of Bull Shoals Dam, the White River returns to its natural riparian state as it heads southeast through the eastern Ozark-St. Francis National Forest.

Ozark Power and Water Company 
In 1910, Congress authorized construction of a hydroelectric dam on the White River by the newly formed Ozark Power and Water Company. Completed in 1913 at a cost of $2.3 million, Powersite Dam near Forsyth, Missouri confined a section of the White River to create Lake Taneycomo. The project brought electricity to a rural area of the Ozark Mountains south of Springfield, Missouri with rural electrification programs in the 1940s expanding service to the surrounding region. Recreation on Taneycomo drew tourism to Rockaway Beach and Branson. The Ozark Power and Electric Company operated independently until 1927 when it merged with Empire District Electric Company in 1927, who own and operate Powersite to this day.

Army Corps of Engineers 
Beaver Lake, Bull Shoals Lake, and Table Rock Lake are man-made lakes or reservoirs created by the U.S. Army Corps of Engineers under the authority of the Flood Control Act of 1938.

Bull Shoals Dam near Mountain Home, Arkansas was constructed from 1947 to 1951 at a cost of $86 million and is the 5th largest concrete dam in the United States. It confines Bull Shoals Lake, the largest of the lakes on the White River and the most downstream.

The next to be constructed was Table Rock Dam near Branson, Missouri, completed in 1958 at a cost of $65 million. It confines Table Rock Lake, the second largest on the White and a popular tourist destination as part of the Branson area.

Beaver Dam near Eureka Springs, Arkansas was built between 1960 and 1966 for $46 million. It confines Beaver Lake, the most upstream dam and reservoir on the river.

A total of eight dams impound the upper White River, six in Arkansas and two in Missouri. The White River National Wildlife Refuge lies along the lower part of the river.

Major Tributaries
The tributaries of the White River include Cache River, Bayou des Arc, Little Red River, Black River, North Fork River, Crooked Creek, Buffalo River, Kings River, James River, and Roaring River.

Settlements

Arkansas 

 Augusta
 Batesville
 Calico Rock
 Newport

Missouri 

 Branson
 Hollister
 Rockaway Beach

Angling
Fishing for trout is popular in the upper portions of the river from the Beaver Lake tailwaters in northwestern Arkansas, through its course through southwest Missouri (including all of Lake Taneycomo), and back down through Arkansas to the Highway 58 bridge in Guion. The river has long been ranked one of the top trout fisheries in the country. Fishing is popular in these waters for a number of trout species including rainbow, brown, and cutthroat trout.  A number of trout fishing resorts lie on the tailwaters of Bull Shoals Lake and the North Fork River. Fishing for white bass is also popular in these waters.

See also

 Cotter Bridge
 Grand Prairie Area Demonstration Project
 List of rivers of Arkansas
 List of longest rivers of the United States (by main stem)
 List of rivers of Missouri
 Whitewater Development Corporation
 White River Monster

References

External links

 
Rivers of Arkansas
Rivers of Missouri
Tributaries of the Mississippi River
Bodies of water of the Ozarks
Ozark–St. Francis National Forest
U.S. Interior Highlands
Rivers of Taney County, Missouri
Rivers of Desha County, Arkansas
Rivers of Arkansas County, Arkansas
Bodies of water of Phillips County, Arkansas
Bodies of water of Monroe County, Arkansas
Bodies of water of Prairie County, Arkansas
Bodies of water of Woodruff County, Arkansas
Bodies of water of White County, Arkansas
Bodies of water of Jackson County, Arkansas
Bodies of water of Independence County, Arkansas
Bodies of water of Stone County, Arkansas
Bodies of water of Izard County, Arkansas
Rivers of Baxter County, Arkansas
Rivers of Marion County, Arkansas
Rivers of Boone County, Arkansas
Rivers of Benton County, Arkansas
Rivers of Carroll County, Arkansas
Rivers of Washington County, Arkansas
Bodies of water of Madison County, Arkansas
Rivers of Franklin County, Arkansas
 01